Chrysodomus is a genus of sea snails, marine gastropod mollusks in the family Buccinidae, the true whelks.

This genus is considered a junior subjective synonym of Neptunea.

Species
Species within the genus Chrysodomus included:
 Chrysodomus acutispiratus G.B. Sowerby III, 1913: synonym of Nassaria acutispirata (Sowerby III, 1913)
 Chrysodomus amiantus Dall, 1890: synonym of Neptunea amianta (Dall, 1890)
 Chrysodomus archibenthalis Melvill & Standen, 1907: synonym of Pontiothauma archibenthalis (Melvill & Standen, 1907)
 Chrysodomus crassicostatus Melvill & Standen, 1907: synonym of Prosipho crassicostatus (Melvill & Standen, 1907)
 Chrysodomus crebricostatus Dall, 1877: synonym of Beringius crebricostatus (Dall, 1877)
 Chrysodomus damon Dall, 1907: synonym of Clinopegma magnum unicum (Pilsbry, 1905)
 Chrysodomus hypolispus Dall, 1891: synonym of Latisipho hypolispus (Dall, 1891)
 Chrysodomus insularis Dall, 1895: synonym of Neptunea insularis (Dall, 1895)
 Chrysodomus intersculptus G.B. Sowerby III, 1899: synonym of Neptunea intersculpta (G.B. Sowerby III, 1899)
 Chrysodomus magnus Dall, 1895: synonym of Clinopegma magna (Dall, 1895)
 Chrysodomus ossiana (Friele, 1879): synonym of Beringius turtoni (Bean, 1834)
 Chrysodomus parallelus Dall, 1907: synonym of Japelion pericochlion (Schrenk, 1863)
 Chrysodomus rectirostris Carpenter, 1864: synonym of Exilioidea rectirostris (Carpenter, 1864)
 Chrysodomus roseus Dall, 1877: synonym of Retifusus roseus (Dall, 1877)
 Chrysodomus smithi Schepman, 1911: synonym of Eosipho smithi (Schepman, 1911)
 Chrysodomus trochoideus Dall, 1907: synonym of Bathyancistrolepis trochoideus (Dall, 1907)
 Chrysodomus virens Dall, 1877: synonym of Retifusus virens (Dall, 1877)

References

Buccinidae
Gastropod genera